Zmaj (English: Dragon) is the eleventh studio album by Bosnian Serb singer Indira Radić, released in 2003.

Track listing
Zmaj
Moj živote da l' si ziv
Vatromet
Tetovaža
Svejedno je
Nisam sumnjala
Bio si mi drag
Tika-tak
Zašto tako naopako
Pedeset godina

Cover versions
During the tour in America, Dada Mešaljić sang Radić's song Zmaj at McDonald's in Florida. Her short performance went viral, which brought her into the limelight of the wider audience. In October 2020, a studio cover version was released.

References

2003 albums
Indira Radić albums
Grand Production albums